Dedication 6 is a two part mixtape by American rapper Lil Wayne, hosted by DJ Drama. The first part of the mixtape was released on December 25, 2017. A second part of the mixtape titled Dedication 6: Reloaded was released on January 26, 2018. It is the sixth installment of Lil Wayne's "Dedication" series, following its predecessors The Dedication, Dedication 2,  Dedication 3, Dedication 4 and Dedication 5. It is the sixth installment of Lil Wayne's "Gangsta Grillz" chronology.

Background
On February 2, 2015, DJ Drama posted a picture of him, Lil Wayne and Mack Maine on Instagram with the caption, "Sorry For The Wait 2. Carter V. Dedication 6". Hip-hop publications, like HotNewHipHop, interpreted the post as an indicator that Dedication 6 will be released after Tha Carter V. On April 4, 2016, DJ Drama invited Lil Wayne and 2 Chainz on an episode of his Shade 45 podcast "Streetz is Watchin" to discuss the release of the album, ColleGrove. The topic of conversation eventually turned to Lil Wayne and DJ Drama's "Dedication" mixtape series, and specifically the whereabouts of the next installment, Dedication 6.

 Wayne also said:

Promotion
Lil Wayne has teased the mixtape several times throughout 2016 and 2017. It was rumored to release some time before the end of 2017. Lil Wayne's manager Cortez Bryant hinted it may release in November 2017. Lil Wayne announced on Twitter that the mixtape would be released on Christmas Day. A few days before the mixtape's release, Lil Wayne released the audios of the tracks "Bank Account" and "Blackin Out" on his YouTube page. On December 29, 2017, Wayne announced on his Twitter a second part of Dedication 6 titled "Dedication 6: Reloaded" and released the audio to the track "Family Feud". On January 23, 2018, Wayne released the audio to the track "Big Bad Wolf". The following day, Wayne released "Bloody Mary" featuring Juelz Santana.

Track listing

References

 
Lil Wayne albums
Young Money Entertainment albums
Sequel albums
DJ Drama albums